Weberbauerocereus rauhii is a species of Weberbauerocereus from Peru.

References

External links
 
 

rauhii
Flora of Peru